Niyasdeen Ramathullah (born 22 October 1993) is a Sri Lankan cricketer. He made his List A debut for Kurunegala District in the 2016–17 Districts One Day Tournament on 19 March 2017.

References

External links
 

1993 births
Living people
Sri Lankan cricketers
Kurunegala District cricketers
Sportspeople from Kandy